Route 51 is a highway in southeastern Missouri.  Its northern terminus is the Illinois state line near Chester, Illinois; its southern terminus is at the Arkansas state line northwest of Piggott, Arkansas.  It continues into Illinois as Illinois Route 150 and it continues into Arkansas as Highway 139.

Route 51 is one of the original 1922 state highways and ran from the Mississippi River to Advance.

Route 51A, a branch route, formerly connected Route 51 with Puxico when Route 51 ended at Advance (at Route 25).  Route 51A would become part of the main highway when it was re-routed and extended.

Route description

History

Major intersections

Former suffixed route

References

051
Transportation in Butler County, Missouri
Transportation in Stoddard County, Missouri
Transportation in Bollinger County, Missouri
Transportation in Perry County, Missouri